HD 125351 or A Boötis (A Boo) is spectroscopic binary in the constellation Boötes. The system has an apparent magnitude of +4.97, with a spectrum matching a K-type giant star. It is approximately 233 light-years from Earth.

References

External links
 HR 5361
 Image HD 125351

Bootis, A
125351
069879
5361
Durchmusterung objects
K-type giants
Boötes
Spectroscopic binaries